Basantpur is a village development committee in Parsa District in the Narayani Zone of southern Nepal. At the time of the 2011 Nepal census it had a population of 7,933 people living in 1,157 individual households. There were 4,094 males and 3,839 females at the time of census.

References

Populated places in Parsa District